Pamela F. Service (born October 8, 1945) is a US writer of speculative fiction for children, predominantly known for the Alien Agent, New Magic, Stinker, and Way-Too-Real Aliens fiction series. She received a BA in Political Science from UC Berkeley, and an MA in history and archeology from the University of London.

Select bibliography

Alien Agent
 My Cousin, the Alien (2008)
 Camp Alien (2009)
 Alien Expedition (2009)
 Alien Encounter (2010)
 Alien Contact (2010) [SF]
 Alien Envoy (2011)

New Magic
 Winter of Magic's Return (1985)
 Tomorrow's Magic (1987)
 Yesterday's Magic (2008)
 Earth's Magic (2009)

Stinker
 Stinker from Space (1988)
 Stinker's Return (1993)

Way-Too-Real Aliens
 Escape from Planet Yastol (2011)
 The Not-So-Perfect Planet (2012)
 The Wizards of Wyrd World (2012)

Standalone Novels
 A Question of Destiny (1986)
 When the Night Wind Howls (1987)
 The Reluctant God (1988)
 Vision Quest (1989)
 Under Alien Stars (1990)
 Being of Two Minds (1991)
 Weirdos of the Universe, Unite! (1992)
 All's Faire (1993)
 Storm at the Edge of Time (1994)
 Phantom Victory (1994)

References

External links

Living people
1945 births